Giorgio Alverà (7 August 1943 – 14 January 2013) was an Italian bobsledder who competed in the mid-1970s. He won a gold medal in the two-man event at the 1975 FIBT World Championships in Cervinia. In the Italian championships he won thrice in the two-man event (from 1973 to 1975) and twice in the four-man event (1974, 1975).

At the 1976 Winter Olympics in Innsbruck, Alvera finished eighth in the two-man event and twelfth in the four-man event.

References

1943 births
2013 deaths
Bobsledders at the 1976 Winter Olympics
Italian male bobsledders
Olympic bobsledders of Italy